In geometry, a Devil's curve, also known as the Devil on Two Sticks, is a curve defined in the Cartesian plane by an equation of the form

The polar equation of this curve is of the form

.

Devil's curves were discovered in 1750 by Gabriel Cramer, who studied them extensively. 

The name comes from the shape its central lemniscate takes when graphed. The shape is named after the juggling game diabolo, which was named after the Devil and which involves two sticks, a string, and a spinning prop in the likeness of the lemniscate.

For , the central lemniscate, often called hourglass, is horizontal. For  it is vertical. Is , the shape becomes a circle.

Electric Motor Curve

It is defined by an equation of the form

.

The name of the special case comes from the middle shape's resemblance to the coils of wire, which rotate from forces exerted by magnets surrounding it.

References

External links
 
 The MacTutor History of Mathematics (University of St. Andrews) – Devil's curve

Plane curves